The 2016–17 Premier League Tournament was the 29th season of first-class cricket in Sri Lanka's Premier Trophy. Fourteen teams competed, split into two groups of seven. Burgher Recreation Club replaced Sri Lanka Ports Authority Cricket Club, who were relegated from the previous years' tournament, after finishing bottom of the  Plate League. Sinhalese Sports Club won the competition.

Teams
The following teams competed:

Group A
 Badureliya Sports Club
 Bloomfield Cricket and Athletic Club
 Chilaw Marians Cricket Club
 Galle Cricket Club
 Nondescripts Cricket Club
 Sinhalese Sports Club
 Tamil Union Cricket and Athletic Club

Group B
 Burgher Recreation Club
 Colombo Cricket Club
 Colts Cricket Club
 Moors Sports Club
 Ragama Cricket Club
 Saracens Sports Club
 Sri Lanka Army Sports Club

Fixtures

Group A

Group B

Plate League

Super Eight

See also
 2016–17 Premier League Tournament Tier B

References

External links
 Series home at ESPN Cricinfo

Premier League Tournament
Premier League Tournament
Premier League Tournament